Stephen Cattley (28 October 1860 – 11 April 1925) was an English cricketer. He played 23 first-class matches for Surrey between 1879 and 1883.

See also
 List of Surrey County Cricket Club players

References

External links
 

1860 births
1925 deaths
Cricketers from Croydon
English cricketers
Surrey cricketers